Dieppe was the name of three steamships operated by the London, Brighton and South Coast Railway:

, sunk in 1941

Ship names